Kriangkrai Ura-ngam (born November 21, 1993) is a professional footballer from Thailand as a midfielder.

Honours

Buriram United
Thai Premier League Champions : 2011
Thai FA Cup Champions (2) : 2011, 2012
Thai League Cup Champions (2) : 2011, 2012

External links
จอมทัพ...ยังเติร์ก ‘ลุย’เกรียงไกร อุระงาม
Player profile - Goal
Player profile - Thai Premier League

References

1993 births
Living people
Kriangkrai Ura-ngam
Kriangkrai Ura-ngam
Association football midfielders
Kriangkrai Ura-ngam
Kriangkrai Ura-ngam
Kriangkrai Ura-ngam
Kriangkrai Ura-ngam
Kriangkrai Ura-ngam
Kriangkrai Ura-ngam